San Martino is a Romanesque-style, Roman Catholic church located in the town of Este in the province of Padua, region of Veneto, Italy.

History
A church at the site is documented since the 11th century, but was likely more ancient. The dedication to St Martin of Tours is attributed to have occurred during the Lombard era. The Romanesque layout has a 14th-century apse that incorporated what was once a small adjacent church dedicated to St Laurence. The crossing has a round brick dome. The facades is simple with awkward Gothic-style windows. The nave has two flanking aisles. The belltower is peculiar in that it is leaning outward, a trait present since 1400. An inscription near the belltower reports reconstruction of the church in 1293.

The maom chapel has an 18th-century marble altar with two angel sculptures by Antonio Bonazza. The chapel of San Lorenzo has a 14th-century fresco by a follower of Giotto, depicting a Crucifixion with May and St John. Along the wall of the nave are fragments of a triptych depicting the Madonna and Child with St Peter and other saints and a Crucifixion of St Margaret of Antioch.

In the left nave, a polychrome marble altar originally dedicated to St Stephen, once held statues in niches depicting Saints Roch, Stephen, and Sebastian, but now displayed in the Museo Nazionale Atestino. The predella of the altar has reliefs of events of the life of the three saints: Roch captured and led to jail, St Stephen's Martyrdom and St Sebastian's Martyrdom.

In the 19th century, most of the canvases were removed, including a painting of the Martyrdom of St Lawrence by a painter of the school of Tintoretto, and other paintings by Antonio Zanchi.

References

Romanesque architecture in Veneto
13th-century Roman Catholic church buildings in Italy
Churches in Este, Veneto
Churches completed in 1293